Blair Armstrong Kiel (November 29, 1961 – April 8, 2012) was a four-year starting quarterback and punter for the Notre Dame Fighting Irish football team, from 1980 to 1983.  He played professionally for several teams in the National Football League, the Canadian Football League, and the Arena Football League, and was inducted into the Indiana Football Hall of Fame in 1998. Kiel worked as an advisor to corporate real estate clients in the Indianapolis area. He retired to start a non-profit organization to help young athletes plan for when their athletic careers are over.

College
Kiel attended Columbus East High School in Indiana, where he was rated the #3 quarterback in the nation by Parade.  Coach Dan Devine offered him a scholarship to the University of Notre Dame, where Kiel earned the starting quarterback job during his freshman year, four games into the 1980 season.  The team achieved a 9-0-1 record and the #2 ranking before closing the season with losses at USC (3-20) and to Georgia in the Sugar Bowl (10-17).

Kiel went on to become the sixth all-time leading passer for Notre Dame, and holds the record for the team's longest pass play—a 96-yard bomb to Joe Howard against Georgia Tech in 1981.  In his final game, he led his unranked team to victory over 13th-ranked Boston College in the Liberty Bowl.

Professional career
Kiel was selected by the Tampa Bay Buccaneers in the 1984 NFL Draft but only saw playing time in the regular season as a holder on kick attempts.  He later played in seven games over two seasons with the Indianapolis Colts as both a quarterback and punter, and then spent three years with the Green Bay Packers.  Following stints in the Canadian Football League and the Arena Football League, he retired at the end of 1993.

Personal
Kiel resided in the Fishers area and worked as a private quarterback coach. He died of a heart attack at Columbus Regional Hospital on April 8, 2012, at the age of 50.

References

External links
NFL stats
AFL stats

1961 births
2012 deaths
People from Columbus, Indiana
Players of American football from Indiana
American football quarterbacks
Notre Dame Fighting Irish football players
Tampa Bay Buccaneers players
Indianapolis Colts players
Green Bay Packers players
American players of Canadian football
Canadian football quarterbacks
Saskatchewan Roughriders players
Toronto Argonauts players
Cincinnati Rockers players
National Football League replacement players